The Scarab Mk. I was a sports racing car, designed, developed and built by American manufacturer Scarab, between 1957 and 1958.

References

Sports racing cars
1950s cars
Cars of the United States